Neuville-Université is a train station in Neuville-sur-Oise, in Val d'Oise department, in France.

History 
In 1988, RER line A was extended from Nanterre Préfecture to Cergy St Christophe. Neuville–Université station was created on this line in 1994.

Service

Train 
The station is served by RER line A, with a train every 10 minutes toward Cergy-le-Haut and toward Marne-la-Vallée.

It is also served during peak hours by Transilien line L, with a train every 10 minutes toward Cergy–le-Haut and toward Paris St Lazare.

Bus 
STIVO buses serve the station:
 Line 34S to Cergy and Pontoise
 Line 48 to Cergy, Vauréal and Jouy-le-Moutier
 Line 49 to Cergy
Transdev buses also serve the station:
 Line 14 to Conflans-Sainte-Honorine
 Line 16 to Saint-Quentin-en-Yvelines and Poissy
 Line 27 to Saint-Germain-en-Laye and Cergy
Com'Bus line 10 links Neuville–Université station to Limay.

RATP night bus line N152 links the station to Paris St Lazare and Cergy.

References

External links
 

N
N
N